The 2003 European Promotion Cup for Junior Women was the fourth edition of the basketball European Promotion Cup for U18 women's teams, today known as FIBA U18 Women's European Championship Division C. It was played in Iceland from 5 to 9 August 2003. The host team, Iceland, won the tournament.

Participating teams

Final standings

Results

References

2003
2003–04 in European women's basketball
FIBA U18
FIBA